Thomas Botfield  (14 February 1762 – 17 January 1843) was an English metallurgist, geologist, magistrate and deputy-lieutenant of Shropshire, and inventor of a method of  smelting and making iron using the principle of "gas flame or heated air in the blast of furnaces". Botfield's 1828 patent seems to have anticipated most of the elements of the blast furnace as it was used in the 1830s and 1840s.

His father was Thomas Botfield (1738–1801) who acquired a fortune from collieries and iron manufacture, his mother Margaret, only daughter of William Baker of Bromley, Worfield, Shropshire. Thomas Botfield, the younger, born at Dawley, Shropshire, in 1762, was educated at the endowed school of Cleobury Mortimer. He worked as a colliery manager and married in 1800. Seated at Hopton Court in Hopton Wafers, whose manor he purchased in 1812, he funded the rebuilding of Hopton's parish church in 1825. He served as High Sheriff of Shropshire in 1818

He was elected F.R.S. on 18 April 1833.

In 1842, the year before his death, he was appointed treasurer of the Salop Infirmary in Shrewsbury. He died in January 1843 aged 80.

See also
 Hot blast

References

External links 
http://discovery.nationalarchives.gov.uk/details/r/4f930d90-53c2-4d02-bcfc-6616c13fdd46

1762 births
1843 deaths
English geologists
English metallurgists
Fellows of the Royal Society